The Year of Billy Miller, a 2014 children's book written by Kevin Henkes, was a Newbery Honor book in 2014.

Plot
This story is about 7-year-old Billy Miller who, right before the end of summer vacation, has a slight accident resulting in him hitting his head and starting his new year in 2nd grade with a lump on his head. After his slight accident he remained in good condition. There were no bad thoughts in his mind about the incident until he overheard his mom speaking about her concern for Billy. She expressed her worries if he would become forgetful later in life because of the fall Billy suffered from. Billy begins to worry that he will have an issue in 2nd grade because of his fall and believes his mom's concerns will become reality. Billy begins to think he is not smart enough for 2nd grade, thinking he needs to do more than is expected to succeed. As the school year goes by, Billy learns to navigate 2nd grade at his best ability. Billy is later inspired by a classmate of his. Billy also starts to appreciate his family for who and what they are. Billy recognizes and appreciates the hard working mother and father he has and a sister he learns to treat with much more respect. Billy is surrounded by people who care very much about him, and though there are easy and there are hard times, everyone will always be there for him.

Characters
Billy Miller A typical 7-year-old boy with unrealistic worries.
Mama Working mother, High school teacher who would do anything for her son Billy.
Papa  Stay at home father. Fun and supportive.
Sally Miller  Billy's 3-year-old sister.
Ms. Silver Billy's second grade teacher, understanding and willing to help.
Emma Sparks Billy's classmate; rude, puts people down (including Billy).
Gabby Sal and Billy's babysitter.
Ned Henderson Billy's best friend.

Critical reception
In Horn Book Magazine, Thom Barthelmess states, "The Year of Billy Miller is nuanced and human, this quiet novel takes aim squarely at the everyday difficulties of a specific segment of growing up and finds its mark with tender precision". Ilene Cooper states in the Book List Publications "Since this is so age specific, older readers might pass it by. That would be too bad, because this is a story with a lot of heart and sweet incites into growing up". Cheryl Ashton writes in School Journal "Billy himself might have been daunted by a book with more than 200 pages, but eager young readers will find this a great first chapter book to share or read solo". Kevin Illus states in Kirkus Reviews, "Henkes offers what he so often does in these longer works for children: a sense that experiences don't have to be extraordinary to be important and dramatic".

Awards
Newbery Medal Honor Book in 2014.

See also

2013 in literature
Children's Literature

References

2014 American novels
Newbery Honor-winning works
American children's novels
2014 children's books
Greenwillow Books books